The Electronic Visualization Laboratory (EVL) is an interdisciplinary research lab and graduate studies program at the University of Illinois at Chicago, bringing together faculty, students and staff primarily from the Art and Computer Science departments of UIC.  The primary areas of research are in computer graphics, visualization, virtual and augmented reality, advanced networking, and media art.  Graduates of EVL either earn a Masters or Doctoral degree in Computer Science.

History
EVL represents one of the oldest art and engineering collaborations in the United States.  It was founded in 1973 by Tom DeFanti (then of the UIC Chemistry Department, later Computer Science) and Dan Sandin (of the Art Department).  The lab was originally known as the Circle Graphics Habitat, in reference to the then-name of UIC, the University of Illinois at Chicago Circle.  DeFanti and Sandin served as Co-Directors of the lab, joined by Maxine D. Brown as Associate Director 1987.  In 2001, Sandin retired from teaching, but continued to co-direct the lab with DeFanti until his retirement in 2004.  EVL PhD graduate, Jason Leigh took the helm from 2004 through 2014, after which Brown became EVL Director joined by longtime collaborator and computer science professor Andrew Johnson as Director of Research.

Research

Work at EVL over the years has included:
 1977: The Sayre Glove, the first dataglove.
 1981: The Z Box hardware and ZGRASS software (based on DeFanti's prior GRASS programming language), an early graphics system for the Bally home computer. This system featured NTSC video output and was used by a number of computer graphics artists of the time.
 1988: Computer generated PHSColograms, an autostereoscopic 3D technique, with (art)n.
 1992: The CAVE Automatic Virtual Environment, a projection-based virtual reality system.
 1995: The I-WAY event at Supercomputing '95, a prototype of grid computing.
 1997: The STAR TAP project, a linking up of several international high-performance networks.  Followed by the StarLight optical networking facility.
 2013: SpiderSense, a pioneer project in the field of human augmentics. SpiderSense is a wearable device that integrates ultrasound technology with vibrating hardware, allowing users to have directional awareness and "sense" obstacles in the environment without physically seeing the obstacles.

Art
Highlights of the electronic art work done at EVL include:
 Electronic Visualization Events (EVE) in the mid 1970s - live, real-time performances featuring computer graphics, video processing, and music.
 Early computer graphics art videos, created by combining DeFanti's GRASS system on a PDP-11 and the Sandin Image Processor.  The video Spiral PTL (1980) was included in the inaugural collection of video art at the Museum of Modern Art.
 Computer artist Larry Cuba spent time at EVL, using the tools there for his films 3/78 and Calculated Movements, as well as a short special effects sequence for Star Wars.
 In 1996, EVL installed the first publicly accessible CAVE at the Ars Electronica Center in Austria, and presented a number of virtual reality artworks.

EVL was featured in the Chicago New Media 1973-1992 exhibition centering the artwork that was created with the EVL and a demonstration of CAVE 2 was held during the time of the exhibition. The exhibition was held at UIC's gallery 400, and curated by Jon Cates.

SIGGRAPH
The members of EVL have been involved with the SIGGRAPH organization and conference ever since its inception.  DeFanti has served as Secretary (1977-1981) and Chair (1981-1985) of the organization, and 1979 conference chair.  Brown has served as Vice Chair for Operations (1985-1987) and Secretary (1981-1985), and chaired the 1992 conference.  According to Jim Blinn, the popular Electronic Theatre "started out as a bunch of people crowding into Dan Sandin’s dorm room to watch videotapes."  In 1979, DeFanti established the SIGGRAPH Video Review, which has been edited and administered by EVLer Dana Plepys since the mid '80s to present.  At SIGGRAPH '92, EVL organized the "Showcase" event, where researchers demonstrated 35 projects in state-of-the-art computational science and scientific visualization.  At SIGGRAPH '94, EVL organized the VROOM event, demonstrations of the state of virtual reality technology.

In 1998, Brown received the first ever SIGGRAPH Outstanding Service Award for her contributions to the organization.  In 2000, DeFanti and EVL alumna Copper Giloth also received the Outstanding Service Award.

References

External links
 EVL Website
 STAR TAP / STARLIGHT

University of Illinois Chicago
Computer graphics organizations
Research institutes in Illinois
Information technology research institutes
Computer art
1973 establishments in Illinois
Multidisciplinary research institutes